is a 2017 samurai action film starring Takuya Kimura and Hana Sugisaki and directed by Takashi Miike. It is based on the successful manga series by Hiroaki Samura. The narrative focuses on the immortal samurai Manji (Kimura) who becomes the bodyguard of an orphan teenager named Rin Asano (Sugisaki) as they go on a journey of vengeance against the members of the Ittō-ryū samurais who killed the child's parents.

Miike explored different themes in the story such as revenge but in a more complex manner as he sees Manji as a "dark hero" while the team also found to difficult to write multiple fight scenes in the film's time. The director chose Kimura for the role of Manji due to the actor's large popularity something which he felt was similar to the original manga that he also found popular. Sugisaki, on the other hand, was chosen for her energetic role in a commercial. The film premiered out of competition at the 2017 Cannes Film Festival, and was released theatrically in Japan by Warner Bros. Pictures on 29 April 2017.

Grossing $8.40 million, the film did not manage to reach the expected success. However, the film got a generally positive response by critics for the handling fight scenes and the relationship between the two protagonists. It also achieved good sales in Japan involving its home media products. Samura expressed satisfaction when watching the final product. It was promoted to two awards but failed to obtain either of them.

Plot

Manji is a samurai on the run after following his superior's order to kill a corrupt lord and his followers. Manji chose to care for his now insane sister Machi. While on the run, Machi is found being held hostage by a large group of rōnin out for a bounty on Manji's head. When Manji does comply with the rōnins' demands, they proceed to kill Machi. In retaliation Manji kills every member of the group, but is mortally wounded. As there was nothing left to live for, he accepts his death, but Yaobikuni implants "sacred bloodworms" into his body, which heal him.

52 years later: Manji is now an ageless immortal, who is approached by a young girl named Rin Asano who requests his aid as a bodyguard to help avenge the death of her father, Kurose, at the hands of Kagehisa Anotsu and the Ittō-ryū, a society of samurai assassins whom he leads. While Manji reluctantly agrees when a Ittō-ryū member Sabato Kuroi who had the severed head of Rin's mother mounted on his left shoulder. Word of Sabato's death reaches Kagehisa after setting up the Ittō-ryū's contract with Kagimura Habaki for a place in the shogunate, sending Taito Magatsu to deal with Rin and her bodyguard.

Magatsu is defeated, but is spared as he reveals Manji's immortality to the other Ittō-ryū members. Manji later encounters the Ittō-ryū member Eiku Shizuma, but is defeated. Manji and Rin later arrive in Fukagawa where they encounter Kagehisa's loyal follower Makie Otono-Tachibana. While Makie had the upper hand, she cannot not bring herself to kill Manji. She reveals that she has been wondering if she is fighting for the right cause and that she has thought of leaving the group. Rin intervenes, telling her that she seeks vengeance because of the death of his parents whom she loved and Makie leaves them quietly.

The duo later encounter the Mugai-ryū, learning that Kagehisa is going to Mt. Takeo to recruit a dojo master. Mugai-ryū's member Shira attacks Rin after she intervened in his attempt to have sex with a prostitute that the Ittō-ryū hired to pose as Kagehisa. Just as he is about to kill her, Manji takes a hand, but lets him run away. Following Rin's encounter with the real Kagehisa, learning that Kagehisa's actions were influenced by the history between their grandfathers Takayoshi Asano and Saburō Anotsu, Rin leaves Manji to continue her hunt alone while he tries to find her.

When Kagehisa arrives at Mt. Takao he is betrayed by Habaki who has set up an ambush. Separately, Manji and Makie arrive soon after, resulting in an epic all-out battle as Makie sacrifices herself against gunfire from samurai in order to protect Kagehisa. Meanwhile, after killing hundreds on another part of the same battlefield while Kegehisa is being betrayed, Manji runs off after Shira as he abducts Rin to revenge Manji's previously chopping off his hand. Shira demands that Manji disarm himself, but Manji is mindful of Shira's duplicity he uses a small concealed dart to cut through the rope with which Rin is tied.

They engage in a fist fight and Manji sends Shira spiraling to his death off a cliff. Although weakened and bloodied, Kagehisa kills Habaki, and then he encounters Manji who in the end defeats him. Rin is offered to deliver the killing blow of vengeance, while Kagehisa warns Manji that his sons will come after him. Despite his wounds, Manji survives to the battle.

Cast

Takuya Kimura as Manji
Hana Sugisaki as Rin Asano
Sota Fukushi as Kagehisa Anotsu
Hayato Ichihara as Shira
Erika Toda as Makie Otono-Tachibana
Kazuki Kitamura as Sabato Kuroi
Chiaki Kuriyama as Hyakurin
Shinnosuke Mitsushima as Taito Magatsu
Ichikawa Ebizō XI as Eiku Shizuma
Min Tanaka as Kagimura Habaki
Tsutomu Yamazaki as Kensui Ibane

Production

The film was produced and advertised as the 100th film in the career of Miike. Miike was not aware of this goal as he claims he was always busy when developing films but felt satisfied with Blade of the Immortal reaching the 100th movie. Miike wanted to make a samurai movie based on the lack of this genre in Japan as well as the amount of time Blade of the Immortal has finished its serialization by the time he considered grabbing its story to adapt as a film.

The themes of revenge of explored in the feature was something that Miike paralleled with his own career as both do not seem to reach a conclusion. Miike noted that one of the biggest challenges of adapting the manga was the large amount of characters featured in the story and how Manji would often not be present. As a result, Miike decided the stuff should condense the plot from the original manga to make a proper film story. He was attracted to Samura's work based on his handling of characters such as villains who offer a realistic characterization, Manji being "dark hero" and the detailed artwork. The final fight scene was the most difficult part the studio found difficult to make and was done in Kyoto. Nevertheless, he felt that all the actors were committed to their characters during shooting of movie.

The special features featurette titled "Mangi and the 300", indicates that the hyperviolence of Blade of the Immortal was modeled in part on the film version of 300 from several years prior dealing with the Spartans.<ref>DVD release. Featurette titled Mangi and the 300".</ref> It was announced in October 2015. Miike was interested by Samura's manga and thus wanted to create a product that would please the manga author. He was mostly impressed by the reverse ideas in regards to the themes of "light" and "dark", explaining that the main characters did not have a stereotypical appeal commonly found in fiction.

Miike cast Kimura for the role as he found him fitting due to Kimura's personal life and the differences he has with the other members of the music group SMAP. Additionally, since Kimura was also popular within Japanese fandom for over two decades by the time the film was made, he felt that his appeal would attract a bigger audience. When originally thinking Kimura playing the role of Manji, Miike received negative commentaries by his coworkers stating the actor would not play it. However, Miike still felt that due to Kimura's experience in films, he has suitable to play the leading role in the movie. He further claimed ""in order to get those in the movie, using the character of Manji was absolutely instrumental." He said that he personally selected Kimura, "a superstar who made the transition from the Showa era to the Heisei era," as "the world's strongest member of the Miike Gang, the Ittō-ryū fighting school of our film industry."

Kimura expressed multiple thoughts about his acting as Manji, such as how he deals with make up and action sequences. Kimura suffered a major wound while filming, resulting in him not being able to walk for various days. Hana Sugisaki was cast as Rin Asano based on a TV commercial for instant Chinese stir fry food. Miike found the actress did a justifying work in the commercial, inspiring him for such enthusiasm. The theme song of the film, "Live to Die Another Day", is performed by Miyavi, whom Miike noted he had a good relationship with Kimura due to their similar careers.

ReleaseBlade of the Immortal was released theatrically in Japan by Warner Bros. Pictures on 29 April 2017. Variety stated the film earned $6.73 million domestically which they described as "disappointing". The writer suggested that the film's box office performance may have been due to the disbanding of the music group SMAP which actor Takuya Kimura was part of.

 Home media 
In Japan, the initial Blu-ray and DVD Set Premium Edition sold 8,930 copies to rank #3 on the overall Blu-ray Disc chart. The regular edition was #11 with 2,326 copies. The DVD Deluxe Edition for the live-action reached 8,896 copies. The Blu-ray deluxe edition for the live-action reached 20,383 copies.

In the United Kingdom, it was 2018's third best-selling foreign language film on home video (below the Japanese anime films My Neighbor Totoro and Your Name).

Reception
The review aggregation website Rotten Tomatoes gives the film an 86% approval rating, based on reviews from 93 critics with an average rating of 7 out of 10. The website's critical consensus reads, "Blade of the Immortal highlights Takashi Miike's flair for balletic violence,combining what it gives in strict originality with rich characterizations and kinetic thrills." The film has a score of 72 out of 100 on Metacritic (based on 26 critics), indicating "generally favorable reviews".

Critics focused on the large amount of action. Jordan Hoffman of The Guardian gave the film four stars out of five, noting that "the fun really shines when the film revels in the outlandish weapons: enormous double-pronged swords, an axe that looks more like a sharp anvil, blades attached to staffs, blades attached to chains, shurikens for all occasions, etc." "if you are going to see one outlandish and occasionally nauseating bloodbath samurai pic this year, this is the one" Harry Windsor of The Hollywood Reporter found the film to be "less memorable" than 13 Assassins,  but that "there are still pleasures to be had, particularly for those fond of long but expertly choreographed sword fights with regular, and bloody, dismemberments." Variety described as a departure from Miike's previous samurai films as a result of the notable gore while also praising the large amount of fights. The plot was noted to take advatange of supernatural elements in order to focus on battles with the writer describing the film as a chanbara genre.

Another comparison based on Manji's supernatural powers was made by Blu Ray but rather than Logan, the 1986 Highlander film due to the portrayal of immortal fighters. Japan Times highly praised Kimura's work for his emotional and physical scenes despite not being at his prime in the film, comparing him to Tom Cruise.  Although IGN criticized Manji's and Rin's journey for being an excuse to battle a large amount of characters, the reviewer enjoyed their relationship, comparing them to Logan like The Guardian'' while also being selfaware of the idea of revenge.

In May 2017, Hiroaki Samura stated that he rejected Hollywood's suggestions for a live-action due to the changes Westerns tend to make. In regards to Miike's film, he had this to say:

Accolades

References

External links
 

2017 films
2017 action films
2010 fantasy films
2010s Japanese films
2010s Japanese-language films
British action films
Japanese action films
British fantasy films
Japanese fantasy films
British splatter films
Japanese splatter films
Japanese films about revenge
Jidaigeki films
Films directed by Takashi Miike
Live-action films based on manga
Films shot in Kyoto Prefecture
Films produced by Jeremy Thomas
Japanese-language Netflix original films
Warner Bros. films
2010s British films